Rocquigny is the name of several communes in France:

 Rocquigny, Aisne, in the Aisne département
 Rocquigny, Ardennes, in the Ardennes département
 Rocquigny, Pas-de-Calais, in the Pas-de-Calais département